Edward J. Forney House was a historic home located at Greensboro, Guilford County, North Carolina. It was built about 1892, and was a -story, Queen Anne style frame dwelling.  It featured a large polygonal tower.  The house was updated in the early-20th century in the Colonial Revival style.

It was listed on the National Register of Historic Places in 1992. The house was demolished in 1997.

References

Houses on the National Register of Historic Places in North Carolina
Queen Anne architecture in North Carolina
Colonial Revival architecture in North Carolina
Houses completed in 1892
Houses in Greensboro, North Carolina
National Register of Historic Places in Guilford County, North Carolina
University of North Carolina at Greensboro
Demolished buildings and structures in North Carolina
Buildings and structures demolished in 1997